Good styled as GOOD is a South African political party that was formed in December 2018. It is led by its founder Patricia de Lille, current Minister of Tourism and former mayor of Cape Town. The party's policies are predominantly left-wing and its platform is premised on social democracy, environmentalism, anti-racism and Broad-Based Black Economic Empowerment. The party's stronghold is the Western Cape and mainly draws support from the Coloured community.

The party holds two seats in the National Assembly of South Africa, while it also has one seat in the Western Cape Provincial Parliament. In May 2019, De Lille was the only opposition member appointed to serve in the cabinet of South Africa. She had stated that Good would remain an opposition party.

Formation

Patricia de Lille is a South African politician. She was elected to the National Assembly as a Pan Africanist Congress (PAC) member in 1994. She held many leadership positions in the party. During the 2003 floor-crossing period, she broke away from PAC and formed the Independent Democrats (ID). The party was the first political party in South Africa to be led by a woman that contested elections and won seats. In 2010, after meetings between the Democratic Alliance Federal Executive and the Independent Democrats Executive, it was announced that the ID would merge with the Democratic Alliance (DA). Members of the Independent Democrats held dual party membership. The ID was officially dissolved after the 2014 general elections.

In March 2011, De Lille was selected by the Democratic Alliance to be the party's mayoral candidate in Cape Town. She was subsequently elected Mayor of Cape Town in May 2011. She served until October 2018. During the last months of her mayoral career, the Democratic Alliance accused Lille of covering up corruption in the municipality. She strongly denied these allegations. When De Lille resigned as mayor, she also resigned as a member of the Democratic Alliance, citing that the party had been abusive towards her. DA Chief Whip Shaun August and many other councillors, including Mayoral Committee Member for Transport Brett Herron, resigned their positions in protest to the removal of De Lille. They were all members of the previous Independent Democrats. It was speculated that De Lille would revive the Independent Democrats and that it would be the "kingmaker" in the 2019 provincial election.

On 18 November 2018, Patricia de Lille launched the "For Good" political movement and website.

On 2 December 2018, De Lille announced the formation of the "Good" political party in Houghton Estate, a suburb of Johannesburg.

Leadership
Patricia de Lille has said that the party's official leadership will be elected after the 2019 elections. The party is currently managed by interim leaders. The National Leadership Committee consists of 36 members. The interim leadership was announced in January 2019 and is as follows:

Election campaign
At the launch of the political party, De Lille said that the manifesto of the party and premier candidates would be announced in early 2019. The party is registered with the Independent Electoral Commission (IEC) and contested the 2019 national and provincial elections in all of the South African provinces.

On 5 February 2019, the party launched its manifesto. The party's manifesto focused on key issues, such as the reduction of the size of the national cabinet, the prosecution of corrupt individuals and the scrapping of the controversial e-tolls in Gauteng.

The party's local government manifesto for the 2021 municipal elections was launched on 13 September 2021 headed by spatial, economic, social, and environmental justice with a "balanced", evidence-based approach to issues such as poverty and crime.

Election results
The party gained two seats in the National Assembly of South Africa and one seat in the Western Cape Provincial Parliament. The two parliamentary seats were filled by De Lille and Shaun August, while the provincial parliament seat was filled by Brett Herron. De Lille has subsequently accepted the position of Minister of Public Works and Infrastructure in the cabinet of South Africa but has stated that Good will remain an opposition party.

On 17 July 2019, Good contested its first municipal by-election in the George Local Municipality. The party's candidate was Mercia Draghoender. Draghoender defected from the DA to Good. She had previously served as a ward councillor and the mayor of the municipality. The media speculated that this election would be an upset since Draghoender had good name recognition. The African National Congress also had a good chance of winning this election due to vote splitting. The DA ended up retaining the ward but with a majority of only eight votes. Good was in second place with the ANC in third out of several parties that contested the by-election.

The party won its first local government ward in a by-election in November 2020, in Ward 27 (Pacaltzdorp) taking a ward in George from the Democratic Alliance. Richard "Yster" Hector winning the Ward for GOOD, ending up by being GOOD's first ever elected Ward Councillor.

Local elections
In the 2021 municipal elections, GOOD ran in five provinces, six metros, and a thousand wards. The party fielded nine mayoral candidates: general secretary Brett Herron in Cape Town, former Springboks coach Peter de Villiers in his home of Drakenstein, as well as Lloyd Phillips in Johannesburg, Sarah Mabotsa in Tshwane, Lawrence Troon in Nelson Mandela Bay, Elizabeth Johnson in Kimberley, Donovan Saptoe in George, Ryan Don in Saldanha Bay, and Sharifa Essop in Beaufort West.

National Assembly

|-
! Election
! Total votes
! Share of vote
! Seats
! +/–
! Government
|-
! 2019
| 70,408
| 0.40%
| 
| –
|
|}

National Council of Provinces

|-
!Election
!Total # ofseats won
!+/–
|-
!2019
|
|0
|}

Provincial elections 

! rowspan=2 | Election
! colspan=2 | Eastern Cape
! colspan=2 | Free State
! colspan=2 | Gauteng
! colspan=2 | Kwazulu-Natal
! colspan=2 | Limpopo
! colspan=2 | Mpumalanga
! colspan=2 | North-West
! colspan=2 | Northern Cape
! colspan=2 | Western Cape
|-
! % !! Seats
! % !! Seats
! % !! Seats
! % !! Seats
! % !! Seats
! % !! Seats
! % !! Seats
! % !! Seats
! % !! Seats
|-
! 2019
| 0.24|| 0/63
| 0.08|| 0/30
| 0.20|| 0/73
| 0.11|| 0/80
| 0.03|| 0/49
| 0.06|| 0/30
| 0.12|| 0/33
| 0.83|| 0/30
| 3.01|| 1/42
|-
|}

References

2018 establishments in South Africa
Anti-racist organizations in Africa
Black economic empowerment
Political parties established in 2018
Political parties in South Africa
Social democratic parties in South Africa